Comb Ceramic or Pit-Comb Ware (in Europe), Jeulmun pottery or Jeulmun vessel (in Korea) is a type of pottery subjected to geometric patterns from a comb-like tool. This type of pottery was widely distributed in the Baltic, Finland, the Volga upstream flow, south Siberia, Lake Baikal, Mongolian Plateau, the Liaodong Peninsula  and the Korean Peninsula.

The oldest Comb Ceramic is found in the remains of Liao civilization: Xinglongwa culture (6200 BC - 5400 BC).

Cultures
Pit–Comb Ware culture - in Finland, Baltic and Russia
Jeulmun pottery period - in Korean peninsula

See also
 Pottery of ancient Cyprus

References

Ancient pottery
Archaeological cultures in Korea
Archaeological cultures of China
Neolithic cultures of Europe